Breakout Artist